The Virginia League of 1948–1951 was a Class D level American minor baseball league. The league was the last of five professional baseball circuits to be known by that name dating to 1894. The post-World War II league revived the previous incarnation of the Virginia League that had ceased operation after concluding the 1942 season.

History
The 1948–1951 Virginia League played each of its four seasons as a six-team league. The Virginia League headquarters were in Petersburg, with teams in North Carolina and Virginia. The Washington Senators of the American League (who used Nationals as one of their nicknames for many years) sponsored the Emporia club from 1948 to 1950.  The New York Yankees (Blackstone) and St. Louis Cardinals (Lawrenceville) also had affiliates in the Virginia League in 1948.

Among the future Major Leaguer players who played in the Virginia League of 1948–1951, a future All-Star was shortstop Eddie Kasko, a member of the  National League squad (and a future MLB manager and executive), who played for the 1950 Suffolk Goobers.

1948–1951 Virginia League cities represented 
Blackstone, VA: Blackstone Barristers 1948 
Colonial Heights, VA & Petersburg, VA: Colonial Heights-Petersburg Generals 1951 
Edenton, NC: Edenton Colonials 1951 
Elizabeth City, NC: Elizabeth City Albemarles 1950–1951 
Emporia, VA: Emporia Nationals 1948–1950; Emporia Rebels 1951 
Franklin, VA: Franklin Cubs 1948; Franklin Kildees 1949–1951 
Hopewell, VA: Hopewell Blue Sox 1949–1950 
Lawrenceville, VA: Lawrenceville Cardinals 1948; Lawrenceville Robins 1949 
Petersburg, VA: Petersburg Generals 1948–1950 
Suffolk, VA: Suffolk Goobers 1948–1951

Standings & statistics 
1948 Virginia League
 Playoffs: Petersburg 4 games, Suffolk 2; Blackstone 4 games, Franklin 0. Finals: Blackstone 4 games, Petersburg 3.
 

1949 Virginia League
 Playoffs: Franklin 4 games, Suffolk 1; Petersburg 4 games, Emporia 3. Finals: Petersburg 4 games, Franklin 2. 

1950 Virginia League
 Playoffs:Hopewell defeated Franklin by forfeit for fourth place. Emporia 4 games, Hopewell 1; Petersburg 4 games, Elizabeth City 2. Finals: Emporia 4 games, Petersburg 2. 
 
1951 Virginia League
 Playoffs: Colonial Heights-Petersburg 4 games, Suffolk 1; Elizabeth City 4 games, Edenton 3. Finals: Elizabeth City 4 games, Colonial Heights-Petersburg 1.

References

External links
The Virginia League (1948–1951) at Baseball Reference

Defunct minor baseball leagues in the United States
Baseball leagues in Virginia
Baseball leagues in North Carolina
Sports leagues established in 1948
Sports leagues disestablished in 1951